Wolfiporia extensa (Peck) Ginns (syn. Poria cocos F.A.Wolf) is a fungus in the family Polyporaceae.  It is a wood-decay fungus but has a subterranean growth habit.  It is notable in the development of a large, long-lasting underground sclerotium that resembles a small coconut.  This sclerotium called "(Chinese) Tuckahoe" or fu-ling, is not the same as the true tuckahoe used as Indian bread by Native Americans, which is the arrow arum, Peltandra virginica, a flowering tuberous plant in the arum family. W. extensa is also used extensively as a medicinal mushroom in Chinese medicine. Indications for use in the traditional Chinese medicine include promoting urination, to invigorate the spleen function (i.e., digestive function), and to calm the mind.

Names
Common names include hoelen, poria, tuckahoe, China root, fu ling (pīnyīn: fúlíng), and matsuhodo.

Botanical extract
Wolfiporia extensa is a source of a triterpenoid compound, pachymic acid, which has been the object of scientific study based upon the mushroom's role in traditional Chinese medicine. The species is often called cocos in this context.

References

External links
Hoelen (Poria)
Medicinal Mushrooms: Their Therapeutic Properties and Current Medical Usage with Special Emphasis on Cancer Treatments  by Cancer Research UK, 2001

Fungi described in 1891
Fungi of Asia
Fungi of North America
Medicinal fungi
Polyporaceae
Fungi used in traditional Chinese medicine
Taxa named by Charles Horton Peck